Niu Fu (died June 192) was a Chinese military general and politician serving under the warlord Dong Zhuo during the late Eastern Han dynasty.

Life
Niu Fu had served under the warlord Dong Zhuo when the latter was still serving as a military general in Liang Province during the reign of Emperor Ling ( 168–189). Dong Zhuo deeply trusted him and arranged for him to marry his daughter; Niu Fu was thus a son-in-law of Dong Zhuo.

In 189, after Dong Zhuo occupied the imperial capital Luoyang and seized control of the Han central government, he appointed Niu Fu as a General of the Household (中郎將). Later that year, Dong Zhuo ordered Niu Fu to lead troops to attack the White Wave Bandits, who were causing trouble around Hedong Commandery (河東郡), but Niu Fu failed to defeat them.

Between 190 and 191, when Dong Zhuo was at war with a coalition of warlords from the east of Hangu Pass, Niu Fu deployed troops to defend the strategic mountain passes leading into Luoyang. At the same time, he also sent Dong Zhuo's other subordinates, such as Li Jue, Guo Si and Zhang Ji, to lead soldiers to raid and pillage Chenliu (陳留) and Yingchuan (潁川) commanderies, as well as attack the general Zhu Jun at Zhongmu County (中牟縣).

In May 192, Dong Zhuo was assassinated by his subordinate Lü Bu in Chang'an, after which Lü Bu ordered his subordinate Li Su to lead his troops to attack and kill Niu Fu. Niu Fu defeated Li Su and forced him to retreat to Hongnong Commandery (弘農郡). Later, chaos broke out in Niu Fu's camp and many of his soldiers deserted. Niu Fu, left with only five or six men, ordered them to quickly grab all the valuables and flee with him. During the escape, Huchi'er (胡赤兒), one of Niu Fu's subordinates, betrayed him and killed him, and then cut off his head and sent it to Chang'an.

See also
 Lists of people of the Three Kingdoms

References

 Chen, Shou (3rd century). Records of the Three Kingdoms (Sanguozhi).
 Fan, Ye (5th century). Book of the Later Han (Houhanshu).
 Pei, Songzhi (5th century). Annotations to Records of the Three Kingdoms (Sanguozhi zhu).

192 deaths
2nd-century births
Assassinated Chinese politicians
Han dynasty generals
Han dynasty politicians
Dong Zhuo and associates